Curt Cignetti (born June 2, 1961) is an American football coach who has been the head coach of the James Madison Dukes since 2019. He previously served as the head coach for Elon University and was an assistant coach for the University of Alabama for four years.

Playing career
Cignetti was a two-year letterman at West Virginia University.

Coaching career

Early coaching career
After graduating from West Virginia, Cignetti coached at the University of Pittsburgh. He began his coaching career as a graduate assistant at Pitt in 1983 under Foge Fazio. He has also coached at Davidson College, Rice University, and Temple University.

NC State
Cignetti joined Chuck Amato's new staff at NC State in 2000. The 2002 team set a school record with 11 wins. In 2003, Cignetti coached Quarterback Philip Rivers, the ACC Player of the Year. In seven seasons, the Wolfpack participated in five bowls, winning four. In 2006, Cignetti recruited future Super Bowl champion quarterback Russell Wilson to the Wolfpack before joining Nick Saban's new staff at Alabama.

Alabama
Cignetti was an original member of Saban's Alabama coaching staff in 2007, serving as wide receiver coach/recruiting coordinator. The 2008 team finished the regular season 12–0 and the 2009 team finished 14–0 and won the national championship. The Tide won 29 regular season games in a row between 2008 and 2010. Cignetti coached wide receiver Julio Jones and recruited Heisman Trophy winner Mark Ingram II and linebacker Dont'a Hightower, all members of the 2008 recruiting class, which featured six first-round NFL Draft choices.

IUP
IUP had a 4–10 conference record prior to Cignetti's arrival in 2011. In his first year as head coach, the team won 6 of its last 7 games, by an average of 28 points per game, to finish 7–3. In 2012, The Crimson Hawks won the Pennsylvania State Athletic Conference and advanced to the NCAA Regional Finals, finishing 12–2. Cignetti’s 2013 team finished 9–2 and he led IUP to the NCAA playoffs in both 2015 and 2016. His 2016 team finished 10–2. Cignetti finished 53–17 at IUP with three NCAA playoff appearances and two conference championships. On December 31, 2016, he accepted the head coaching position at Elon University.

Elon
The Elon team had had a 4–20 conference record and suffered through six straight losing seasons prior to Cignetti's arrival, but in his first season the squad won eight games in a row after an opening season loss to MAC Champion Toledo. The Phoenix were ranked as high as 6th nationally, played James Madison for the conference championship and were selected for the NCAA Playoffs for the first time since 2009. Cignetti was named CAA coach of the year and was a finalist for the Eddie Robinson National Coach of the Year. In 2018, Cignetti led the Phoenix to a 27–24 win over James Madison, ending JMU's 22-game CAA Football winning streak and then FCS-best 19-game home winning streak. The win marked Elon's first over a top-five FCS opponent. The Phoenix earned back to back NCAA playoff appearances for the first time in program history.

James Madison
Curt Cignetti was named Head Football Coach at James Madison on December 14, 2018. In his first season, Cignetti led the Dukes to a seven game improvement over 2018, finishing 14–2 and an appearance in the 2020 National Championship. 2021 saw the Dukes play two seasons, spring and fall whle claiming two Conference Championships and appearing in two National Semifinal contests. JMU went 19-3 in '21 and announced a move to the Sun Belt Conference effective Fall '22.

Personal life
Cignetti and his wife, Manette, have three children, Curtis Jr., Carly Ann, and Natalie Elise. Cignetti's father, Frank Cignetti Sr., won 199 games as a head coach at West Virginia University and IUP and was inducted into the College Football Hall of Fame. His brother, Frank Jr., is currently the offensive coordinator at Pittsburgh.

Head coaching record

References

External links
 James Madison profile
 Elon profile
 IUP profile

1961 births
Living people
American football quarterbacks
Alabama Crimson Tide football coaches
Davidson Wildcats football coaches
IUP Crimson Hawks football coaches
James Madison Dukes football coaches
NC State Wolfpack football coaches
Pittsburgh Panthers football coaches
Rice Owls football coaches
Temple Owls football coaches
West Virginia Mountaineers football players
Sportspeople from Pittsburgh
Players of American football from Pittsburgh